The following is a select discography of albums and singles released by or featuring American rapper, producer, and actor, David Banner.

Albums

Studio albums

Mixtapes

Singles

As lead artist

Guest appearances

See also
David Banner production discography
Crooked Lettaz discography

References

External links
David Banner at AllMusic
David Banner at Discogs

Hip hop discographies
Discographies of American artists